Spencer Bernau Wilks (26 May 189110 March 1971) was a British manager and administrator in the motor manufacturing industry.  He served variously in positions including Managing Director, Chairman, and President of the Rover Company from 1929 until the 1960s. Previously he worked for the Hillman Motor Car Company in Coventry.  His younger brother Maurice Wilks also worked at Rover as Chief Engineer, Technical Director and Managing Director from 1930. He is one of Land Rover's founders along with Maurice.

Early life and education
Wilks was born in Rickmansworth to Thomas Wilks (born Balham), a Director of Leather Co and his wife Jane Eliza (born St. Sepulchre, London), a Suffragette.  He had one sister and four brothers including Maurice.

Career
Wilks was initially trained as a solicitor, but his wife Kathleen Edith was a daughter of William Hillman, founder of the Hillman Motor Car Company, and so he became a joint manager in 1921 on the death of his father in law.  In 1929, he left Hillman after disagreement with the Rootes brothers who took it over in 1928.
  
In September 1929, Wilks began employment as Works manager at the Rover Company in Coventry, having been invited by the Managing Director Frank Searle to join the board. By 1930, he was joined by his brother Maurice as Chief Engineer.

Land Rover
In 1947, he founded Land Rover around Maurice's design for a small, sturdy, economical, four wheel drive utility vehicle modelled on the Willys Jeep.

Managerial career
In 1934, he was appointed managing director of Rover, and became Chairman in 1957.  In 1962, although retired, he served as a non-executive director; and in 1967, he became President of Rover.

Private life
Wilks married Kathleen Edith Hillman (b. 1891), one of the six daughters of William Hillman. He died on 10 March 1971, aged 79.

References

  The Times - Saturday, 10 June 1967.
 

1891 births
1971 deaths
British automobile designers
British founders of automobile manufacturers
Land Rover
Rover Company
People from Rickmansworth